The Resurrection is the fifth studio album by the hip hop group known as the Geto Boys. The album was released on April 2, 1996, when the Geto Boys reunited following a 3-year breakup. It peaked at number six on the Billboard 200, becoming the group's only top ten album in the United States. It is considered by fans to be one of the group's most critically praised albums and the first of two especially creative albums. The majority of the album was produced by Mike Dean.

Reception

The Resurrection has received positive reviews, with some reviewers calling the album the best album the Geto Boys have ever made. In a positive review, AllMusic's Stephen Thomas Erlewine wrote "The Resurrection outstrips every other Geto Boys record in every sense -- it is the leanest, meanest, and funkiest thing they've ever recorded." James Bernard of Entertainment Weekly gave the album a B+, writing "What makes this their best work is the album's festive mood, despite its harsh subject matter."

In 2005, the comedian Chris Rock ranked The Resurrection 15th on his list of the Top-25 Hip-Hop Albums ever.

Track listing

Note
Tracks 1, 3, 5, 7, 9 12 & 14 are omitted on the vinyl LP, cutting the album's track listing in half for that format.

Samples
"Geto Fantasy"
"Love Don't Live Here Anymore" by Rose Royce
"The World Is a Ghetto"
"The World Is a Ghetto" by War

Uses in media
The song "Still" was used in the 1999 Mike Judge film Office Space during the scene when Peter, Samir and Michael destroy a printer in the middle of a field with a baseball bat. "Still" was produced by N.O. Joe. A parody of the scene (using a censored version of "Still") was made by Brian and Stewie on the Family Guy season seven episode "I Dream of Jesus", in which they destroy a record of the song "Surfin' Bird" by The Trashmen. The uncensored version of the song is available on the Family Guy volume seven DVD. Another parody of the scene was used for Spike TV's commercial of their coverage of the Consumer Electronics Convention in Las Vegas, shown in December 2011 and starring iJustine. In Silicon Valley, Mike Judge again sampled from this album by using the song "First Light of the Day" in the closing credits of the fourth episode of the show's sixth season.

Charts

Weekly charts

Year-end charts

Singles

Certifications

See also
List of number-one R&B albums of 1996 (U.S.)

References

1996 albums
Geto Boys albums
Rap-A-Lot Records albums
Albums produced by N.O. Joe
Albums produced by Mike Dean (record producer)